Mieczysław Szczuka (19 October 1898 – 13 August 1927) was a Polish avant-garde artist and mountaineer.

Szczuka was born in Warsaw, Kingdom of Poland, Russian Empire (now Poland) and studied painting in 1915–1918 at the Academy of Fine Arts in Warsaw, with Professor Miłosz Kotarbiński. After graduation, he worked as painter and graphic artist. His main work was as a book illustrator and a theatre set designer. He also produced photomontages and abstract art films. Szczuka participated in several international exhibitions such as the "First exhibition of modern art" in Bucharest. A promoter of utilitarianism in Poland, Szczuka joined the group of avantgarde artists "Blok".

Diagnosed with tuberculosis, in 1923 Mieczysław Szczuka moved to the mountain resort of Zakopane at the foot of Tatras. He started mountaineering and in 1923-1927 repeated some most difficult climbs of the time and established own new routes.

He died in an accident while climbing the south face of Zamarła Turnia in the Tatra Mountains with a novice climber.

References 
 Kossowska, Irena. Sylwetki sztuka. Mieczysław Szczuka Instytut Sztuki Polskiej Akademii Nauk, July 2002.  (Retrieved 13 April 2010)
 Internet version of Wielka Encyklopedia Tatrzanska, entry "Szczuka Mieczysław" (as a mountaineer)  (after Zofia i Witold H. Paryscy, Wielka Encyklopedia Tatrzańska) (Retrieved 13 April 2010)
 Zofia Radwańska-Paryska, Witold Henryk Paryski – Wielka Encyklopedia Tatrzańska'' Wydawnictwo Górskie, 1995, reprint edition 2004,

External links 

 18 Most Important Polish Graphic Designers of the 20th Century

1898 births
1927 deaths
20th-century Polish painters
20th-century Polish male artists
Polish mountain climbers
Mountaineering deaths
Artists from Warsaw
Academy of Fine Arts in Warsaw alumni
Polish male painters
Sport deaths in Poland